50 Song Memoir is the eleventh studio album by American indie pop band The Magnetic Fields, released on March 10, 2017. 50 Song Memoir is an autobiographical concept album that chronicles the first 50 years of lyricist Stephin Merritt's life, with one song for each year that he has lived.

Recording 

Stephin Merritt began recording on his fiftieth birthday on February 9, 2015. The album was produced by Merritt with additional production by Thomas Bartlett and Charles Newman. Merritt sings on all fifty tracks.

Tour 
The fully staged live shows in support of 50 Song Memoir were directed by José Zayas with an expanded Magnetic Fields lineup that included three additional musicians for the tour for a total of seven musicians, each playing a different instrument. On the tour the band played the entirety of 50 Song Memoir in two halves across two nights at each venue.

Release 
50 Song Memoir is available in five-L.P. and five-C.D. editions that include an interview by Daniel Handler and facsimile handwritten lyrics by Stephin Merritt, and as a bound book.

Reception 

Upon release, the album received near universal acclaim, with the average critical score being an 86 out of 100 according to review aggregator website Metacritic.

Accolades

Track listing

Personnel 
The Magnetic Fields

 Stephin Merritt – lead vocals, Roland vocoder, ukulele, resonator ukulele, bass ukulele, 8-string ukulele, classical guitar, 12-string guitar, electric guitar, baritone guitar, electric bass, acoustic bass, mandola, autoharp, marxolin, bass banjo, charango, cavaquinho, harp, hammered dulcimer, bowed psaltery, electric sitar, Prophet-5, ARP String Ensemble, Moog Voyager, Casio VL-Tone, piano, keyboards, Wurlitzer electric piano, Rhodes Piano Bass, organ, pianet, celeste, toy piano, prepared piano, Omnichord, audio pattern generator, kazoo, melodica, xylophone, glockenspiel, bass drum, log drum, slit drum, ocean drum, cymbal, tubes, rainstick, wind chimes, chimes, maracas, conga, bongos, triangle, tambourine, washboard, steel drum, shakers, finger cymbals, guiro, djembe, cajon, woodblock, bells, sleighbells, fingersnaps, thunder sheet, cabasas, cowbells, tongs, bottle, abacus, drum machines, tapes, feedback
 Claudia Gonson – background vocals, piano
 Sam Davol – cello, musical saw
 John Woo – guitar
 Shirley Simms – background vocals

Additional personnel

 Thomas Bartlett – mellotron, clavinet, omnichord, rhodes, piano, Moog synthesizer, optigan
 Christopher Ewen – synthesizers, kazoo, angklung, stylophone, omnichord
 Pinky Weitzman – viola, Stroh violin, musical saw
 Daniel Handler – background vocals, accordion, vibraphone, piano, Hammond organ, celeste
 Johny Blood – tuba, flugelhorn, mouthpiece
 Brad Gordon – trombone, pocket trumpet
 Randy Walker – background vocals
 Anthony Kaczynski – background vocals
 Otto Handler – spoken word

Charts

References 

2017 albums
Concept albums
Nonesuch Records albums
The Magnetic Fields albums